Kosmos 1278 ( meaning Cosmos 1278) was a Soviet US-K missile early warning satellite which was launched in 1981 as part of the Soviet military's Oko programme. The satellite was designed to identify missile launches using optical telescopes and infrared sensors.

Kosmos 1278 was launched from Site 43/3 at Plesetsk Cosmodrome in the Russian SSR. A Molniya-M carrier rocket with a 2BL upper stage was used to perform the launch, which took place at 19:37 UTC on 19 June 1981. The launch successfully placed the satellite into a molniya orbit. It subsequently received its Kosmos designation, and the international designator 1981-058A. The United States Space Command assigned it the Satellite Catalog Number 12547.

It self-destructed in December 1986 and re-entered the Earth's atmosphere on 2 September 2000.

See also

 1981 in spaceflight
 List of Kosmos satellites (1251–1500)
 List of Oko satellites
 List of R-7 launches (1980-1984)

References

Kosmos satellites
Oko
Spacecraft launched by Molniya-M rockets
Spacecraft launched in 1981
Spacecraft which reentered in 2000